Toadmoor Tunnel (originally called Hag Wood Tunnel) was built at Ambergate as part of the North Midland Railway, which opened in 1840.

128 yards long, it was cut through an unstable hillside on a notoriously difficult line of route. What had initially been expected to be acceptably strong coal-bearing rock turned out to be wet shale. On beginning excavation a landslide occurred, the effects of which can still be seen further up the bank in Thatcher's Wood.

The engineer Frederick Swanwick decided to proceed using the cut-and- cover method, with stone retaining walls and invert, and a brick-built masonry arch over the top, which gives it its unusual elliptical shape. Because of this, it took 15 months to build, instead of the planned two.

It is thought that a second landslip may have occurred sometime later, so that it was braced with steel hoops at its southern end.

Because of the tunnel cross section the depth of ballast under the track is adequate in the centre but almost nothing close to the walls, which produces settlement in the middle and crushed ballast at the edges.

Other problems arise with a need for increased line speed and the arrival of electrification, not least because it is grade 2 listed and part of the Derwent Valley World Heritage Site.

External links

"Picture the Past" Toadmoor Tunnel c.1957

References

Rail transport in Derbyshire
Railway tunnels in England
History of Derbyshire
Tunnels in Derbyshire
Tunnels completed in 1839